Brad Hamilton is a Jamaican swimmer.

He holds Jamaican records in the 50 and 100 M Breaststroke, the 50, 100, and 200 M Butterfly, and the 400 and 800 M Freestyle Relays.

References

External links 
 The record page for the Amateur Swimming Association of Jamaica
 Hamilton's Jamaican swimming biography

Living people
1989 births
Jamaican male swimmers
Male breaststroke swimmers
Male butterfly swimmers
Jamaican male freestyle swimmers
Commonwealth Games competitors for Jamaica
Swimmers at the 2006 Commonwealth Games
Pan American Games competitors for Jamaica
Swimmers at the 2007 Pan American Games